Cerro Aracamuni is a granitic tepui in Amazonas state, Venezuela. Part of the Neblina–Aracamuni Massif, it lies north of Cerro Avispa and the vast complex of Cerro de la Neblina.

Cerro Aracamuni lies within the Serranía de la Neblina National Park. There is illegal mining activity at its base.

Cerro Aracamuni emerald-barred frog, Ceuthomantis aracamuni, is only known from Cerro Aracamuni.

See also
 Distribution of Heliamphora

References

Tepuis of Venezuela
Mountains of Venezuela
Geography of Amazonas (Venezuelan state)